Darren Morfitt (born 12 September 1973) is an English actor who has appeared in 55 Degrees North, Grafters, Dalziel and Pascoe, Warriors, Making Waves, The Government Inspector and the cult werewolf movie Dog Soldiers.

Moriftt was born in Hartlepool, England. After finishing his A-levels at Hartlepool Sixth Form College, Morfitt went to Mountview Academy of Theatre Arts, London and learned his trade. He graduated in 1997 and won his first major television role as Dean Hocknell in the football drama Dream Team.

In 2006, he portrayed as Jesus in the Manchester Passion, a live dramatization of the Easter story using songs associated with Manchester. A year later, in 2008, he appeared in the science fiction action film Doomsday as Dr. Ben Stirling. He has also appeared in two 2010 episodes of science fiction programme Doctor Who, "The Time of Angels" and "Flesh and Stone" as Billy. 

In 2014, he appeared in the Tracy Beaker spin-off The Dumping Ground as Mr. Jenkins, a football coach who racially insulted one of the main characters.

It was while at Mountview that Morffitt met his wife, the actress Helen Latham.  They met in 1995 and were married in 2004.

Filmography

References

External links

1973 births
English male film actors
English male television actors
Living people
People from Hartlepool
Actors from County Durham